Humboldt Hill is a census-designated place (CDP) in Humboldt County, California, United States. The population was 3,414 at the 2010 census, up from 3,246 at the 2000 census. The area is in the 95503 zip code and part of unincorporated Eureka.

Geography

Demographics

2010
The 2010 United States Census reported that Humboldt Hill had a population of 3,414. The racial makeup of Humboldt Hill was 2,853 (83.6%) White, 41 (1.2%) African American, 119 (3.5%) Native American, 102 (3.0%) Asian, 2 (0.1%) Pacific Islander, 129 (3.8%) from other races, and 168 (4.9%) from two or more races. Hispanic or Latino of any race were 298 persons (8.7%).

The Census reported that 3,187 people (93.4% of the population) lived in households, 145 (4.2%) lived in non-institutionalized group quarters, and 82 (2.4%) were institutionalized.

There were 1,325 households, out of which 360 (27.2%) had children under the age of 18 living in them, 653 (49.3%) were opposite-sex married couples living together, 143 (10.8%) had a female householder with no husband present, 66 (5.0%) had a male householder with no wife present.  There were 112 (8.5%) unmarried opposite-sex partnerships, and 17 (1.3%) same-sex married couples or partnerships. 326 households (24.6%) were made up of individuals, and 151 (11.4%) had someone living alone who was 65 years of age or older. The average household size was 2.41.  There were 862 families (65.1% of all households); the average family size was 2.87.

The population was spread out, with 646 people (18.9%) under the age of 18, 374 people (11.0%) aged 18 to 24, 773 people (22.6%) aged 25 to 44, 1,024 people (30.0%) aged 45 to 64, and 597 people (17.5%) who were 65 years of age or older.  The median age was 42.2 years. For every 100 females, there were 94.6 males.  For every 100 females age 18 and over, there were 95.1 males.

The homeowner vacancy rate was 1.4%; the rental vacancy rate was 3.4%.  2,434 people (71.3% of the population) lived in owner-occupied housing units and 753 people (22.1%) lived in rental housing units.

2000
As of the census of 2000, there were 3,246 people, 1,209 households, and 851 families residing in the CDP. The racial makeup of the CDP was 87.68% White, 0.89% Black or African American, 3.27% Native American, 1.85% Asian, 0.31% Pacific Islander, 2.00% from other races, and 4.00% from two or more races.  6.07% of the population were Hispanic or Latino of any race.

There were 1,209 households, out of which 29.9% had children under the age of 18 living with them, 53.9% were married couples living together, 11.9% had a female householder with no husband present, and 29.6% were non-families. 22.9% of all households were made up of individuals, and 10.3% had someone living alone who was 65 years of age or older.  The average household size was 2.50 and the average family size was 2.93.

In the CDP, the population was spread out, with 22.9% under the age of 18, 10.9% from 18 to 24, 24.2% from 25 to 44, 25.5% from 45 to 64, and 16.5% who were 65 years of age or older.  The median age was 40 years. For every 100 females, there were 97.8 males.  For every 100 females age 18 and over, there were 92.4 males.

The median income for a household in the CDP was $37,121, and the median income for a family was $42,826. Males had a median income of $35,500 versus $28,304 for females. The per capita income for the CDP was $16,222.  About 7.5% of families and 11.5% of the population were below the poverty line, including 13.8% of those under age 18 and 4.2% of those age 65 or over.

Politics

See also

References

External links
 Humboldt Economic Index

Populated coastal places in California
Eureka, California
Census-designated places in Humboldt County, California
Census-designated places in California